Odil Abdurakhmanov (uzb. Odil Abdurahmonov, cyrillic: Одил  Каландарович  Абдурахманов,  born 6 February 1978) is a state adviser to the President on the development of science, youth politics, education, healthcare and sports. At the same time he is the President of Bodybuilding and Fitness Federation of Uzbekistan. Previously, he worked as chief consultant at the presidential administration. He also headed the Republican scientific center for employment, labor security and social protection of the population.

Career 
Politics

 2020- Rector of Tashkent State Transport University
 2022 - Adviser to the President on youth politics, science, education, health, culture and sports issues.
 2018-2019 - Deputy minister of higher and secondary specialized education.
 Chief consultant in the Presidential Administration of Uzbekistan
 2019 - Deputy Advisor to the President for the Development of Science, Education, Health and Sports
 2011- Head of  the Republican Scientific Center for Employment, Labor Protection and Social Protection of the Population.

Sports
 2006 - Founder of Bodybuilding and Fitness Federation of Uzbekistan
 2019 -  President of Bodybuilding and Fitness Federation of Uzbekistan

Personal life 
Abdurakhmanov is married and father of 2 kids.

References 

1978 births
Politicians from Tashkent
Living people